Solenosteira is a genus of sea snails, marine gastropod mollusks in the family Pisaniidae.

Species
Species within the genus Solenosteira include:
 Solenosteira anomala (Reeve, 1846)
 Solenosteira cancellaria (Conrad, 1846)
 Solenosteira capitanea Berry, 1957
 Solenosteira fusiformis (Blainville, 1832)
 Solenosteira gatesi Berry, 1963
 Solenosteira macrospira (Berry, 1957)
 Solenosteira mendozana (Berry, 1959)
 Solenosteira pallida (Broderip & G. B. Sowerby I, 1829)
  † Solenosteira subcarinata (Lamarck, 1803)
Synonyms
 Solenosteira elegans Dall, 1908: synonym of Hesperisternia elegans (Dall, 1908) (original combination)
 † Solenosteira mengeana Dall, 1890: synonym of † Urosalpinx mengeana W.H. Dall, 1890  
Taxa inquirenda
 † Solenosteira cochlearis Guppy, 1911 
 † Solenosteira semiglobosa Guppy, 1911

References

 Dall W.H. (1890). Contributions to the Tertiary fauna of Florida with especial reference to the Miocene silex-beds of Tampa and the Pliocene beds of the Caloosahatchie River. Part I. Pulmonate, opisthobranchiate and orthodont gastropods. Transactions of the Wagner Free Institute of Sciences, Philadelphia. 3(1): 1-200, pls 1-12.

Pisaniidae